Switzerland competed at the 2004 Summer Olympics in Athens, Greece, from 13 to 29 August 2004. Swiss athletes competed at every Summer Olympic Games in the modern era, except when they boycotted the 1956 Summer Olympics in Melbourne as a protest to the Soviet invasion of Hungary. The Swiss Olympic Association sent a total of 98 athletes to the Games, 59 men and 39 women, to compete in 18 sports.

Medalists

Athletics

Swiss athletes have so far achieved qualifying standards in the following athletics events (up to a maximum of 3 athletes in each event at the 'A' Standard, and 1 at the 'B' Standard).

Men
Track & road events

Field events

Women
Track & road events

Field events

Canoeing

Slalom

Sprint

Qualification Legend: Q = Qualify to final; q = Qualify to semifinal

Cycling

Road
Men

Women

Track
Pursuit

Omnium

Mountain biking

Diving

Men

Equestrian

Dressage

Eventing

Show jumping

Fencing

Men

Gymnastics

Artistic
Men

Women

Trampoline

Judo

Modern pentathlon

Switzerland has qualified a single athlete in modern pentathlon.

Rowing

Men

Women

Qualification Legend: FA=Final A (medal); FB=Final B (non-medal); FC=Final C (non-medal); FD=Final D (non-medal); FE=Final E (non-medal); FF=Final F (non-medal); SA/B=Semifinals A/B; SC/D=Semifinals C/D; SE/F=Semifinals E/F; R=Repechage

Sailing

Men

Women

Open

M = Medal race; OCS = On course side of the starting line; DSQ = Disqualified; DNF = Did not finish; DNS= Did not start; RDG = Redress given

Shooting

Men

Women

Swimming

Swiss swimmers earned qualifying standards in the following events (up to a maximum of 2 swimmers in each event at the A-standard time, and 1 at the B-standard time):

Men

Women

Synchronized swimming

Switzerland has qualified a spot in the women's duet.

Tennis

Triathlon

Switzerland has qualified five athletes in both men's and women's triathlon.

Volleyball

Beach

Wrestling

Men's freestyle

Men's Greco-Roman

See also
 Switzerland at the 2004 Summer Paralympics

References

External links
Official Report of the XXVIII Olympiad
Swiss Olympic Association 

Nations at the 2004 Summer Olympics
2004
Summer Olympics